Endre György (18 March 1848 – 15 January 1927) was a Hungarian politician, who served as Minister of Agriculture in 1905.

References
 Magyar Életrajzi Lexikon	

1848 births
1927 deaths
People from Khust
Agriculture ministers of Hungary